Zimbabwe Institute of Management is a membership based and non-profit making management organisation founded in 1957 with the main goal of promoting and developing best practices in management and leadership. The Institute's membership is categorised into individual, corporate and student members. Its range of products include executive diplomas in Business Leadership, General Management, Applied Strategy, Sports Management as well as diplomas in Business Administration, Project Management, Environmental Health & Safety Management, Supervisory Management and Security Management. The Institute also offers certificate courses in various fields of management in addition to customised in-house programmes to corporate clients.

Awards 
The Zimbabwe Institute of Management Awards were established in 1978 by the organisation to recognise, develop and promote management leadership excellence at all managerial levels. The awards are held annually. The 1978 awards were made possible by a donation from Kurt Kuhn, an ex-repatriate managing director at Zisco Steel. The first recipient of the award was J Fraser, the 10th general manager of Bata Shoe Company.

The award categories are

 Private sector leader of the year,
 Public service leader of the year,
 SME leader of the year,
 Young leader of the year,
 Customer service excellence,
 National contribution award / Lifetime Achievement Award,
 Regional Contribution Award
 Most Influential Leader of the Year Award

The manager of the year award is the most prestigious award and is judged on profitability, growth, human resources development, quality of social responsibility, economic development of their organisation as well as personal development of the nominated individual.

The awards kick off as regional awards and after the regional awards, national awards are held. Regional awards are held in the following regions:

 Bulawayo/Southern Regional Awards
 Gweru Regional Awards
 Mutare Regional Awards
 Harare Regional Awards

Nomination Process 
Any one serving in a leadership role is eligible to be in the running for the awards through nominations invited during the first quarter of each year through press adverts as well as through the institutes' database of members and managers from both the private and public sectors. Advertisements are also placed in the local newspapers calling for nominations and once nominations are received, the nominee is invited to make a submission following a set criteria that is used by the adjudication panel.

Once submissions are received, the process commences with adjudication taking centre stage. An independent adjudication panel set up by the Council of the Institute adjudicates on the nominees‘ submissions.

The awards are available for presentation each year to personalities who, in the opinion of the Institute have made outstanding contribution to management in Zimbabwe.

Nominee Requirements and Assessments 
The requirements for a nominee are company profile, resume, organisation's history, organisational structure, details of personal development and details of social responsibility and three referees who can be business partners, employers, suppliers or immediate superiors. Assessment depend on this supplied information and include non-statistical factors such as management of people, tasks, processes, macro-environment fundamentals, recognition by internal and external stake-holders, quality of social responsibilities, human resources development and leadership.

Ceremonies and Winners

2017

2016

See also 

 Zimbabwe National Chamber of Commerce
 Megafest Business Awards 
Zimbabwe Institute of Legal Studies
Zimbabwe Institution of Engineers

References 

Organisations based in Zimbabwe